Eversden may refer to:

Great Eversden, a village 6 miles south-west of Cambridge, England
Little Eversden, a village approximately 7 miles south-west of Cambridge, England